Söndagsöppet was a television show broadcast on SVT on Sundays. The first broadcast was on 7 October 1990 and the last episode was broadcast on 21 December 2003 after 27 seasons.

References

Sveriges Television original programming